Cornelius Bonner (born September 1, 1976) is a former American football wide receiver who played in the Arena Football League (AFL). The 6 feet tall and 190 pounds receiver played college football for the University of Cincinnati.

Bonner played on five teams in the AFL: Chicago Rush (2001–2003), Las Vegas Gladiators (2004–2005), Nashville Kats (2006, 2007), Grand Rapids Rampage (2007), and Cleveland Gladiators (2008). He wore jersey number 8 with the Gladiators.

External links
Stats from arenafan.com

1976 births
Living people
People from Cherokee County, South Carolina
American football wide receivers
Cincinnati Bearcats football players
Chicago Rush players
Las Vegas Gladiators players
Nashville Kats players
Grand Rapids Rampage players
Cleveland Gladiators players
Georgia Force players